Saputra is an Indonesian surname. Notable people with the surname include:
 Angga Saputro (born 1993), Indonesian footballer
 Dany Saputra (born 1991), Indonesian footballer
 Eko Roni Saputra (born 1991), Indonesian mixed martial artist
 Frendi Saputra (born 1992), Indonesian footballer
 Govinda Julian Saputra (born 1996), Indonesian basketball player
 Hanny Saputra (born 1965), Indonesian director
 Harry Saputra (born 1981), retired Indonesian footballer
 Hendri Saputra (born 1981), Indonesian-born Singaporean retired badminton player
 Herwin Tri Saputra (born 1991), Indonesian footballer
 Jimmi Saputra (born 1972), Indonesian technology entrepreneur and businessman
 Leo Saputra (born 1980), Indonesian footballer
 Miswar Saputra (born 1996), Indonesian footballer
 Nicholas Saputra (born 1984), Indonesian actor and film producer
 Ramadhan Saputra (born 1986), Indonesian footballer
 Rendi Saputra (born 1989), Indonesian footballer
 Rendy Saputra (born 1989), Indonesian footballer
 Riski Fajar Saputra (born 2000), Indonesian footballer
 Ruly Saputra (born 1988), Indonesian footballer
 Surya Saputra (born 1975), Indonesian actor, singer, and model
 Surya Saputra (wrestler) (born 1967), Indonesian wrestler
 Widya Saputra (born 1985), Indonesian TV presenter
 Yantoni Edy Saputra (born 1997), Indonesian male badminton player

Indonesian-language surnames
Surnames of Indonesian origin